East High School may refer to:


United States

East Community Learning Center (Akron, Ohio), previously known as East High School
East High School (Arizona), Phoenix, Arizona
East High School (Denver, Colorado)
East High School (Pueblo, Colorado)
East High School (Sioux City, Iowa)
East High School (Des Moines, Iowa)
East High School (Minnesota), Duluth, Minnesota
East High School (Missouri), Kansas City, Missouri
East High School (Buffalo, New York)
East High School (Corning, New York)
East High School (Rochester, New York)
East High School (Cleveland, Ohio)
East High School (Columbus, Ohio)
East High School (Youngstown, Ohio)
East High School (Erie, Pennsylvania)
East High School (Memphis, Tennessee)
East High School (Morristown, Tennessee)
East High School (Utah), Salt Lake City, Utah

Schools with variant names in the United States
East Anchorage High School, Anchorage, Alaska
East Bakersfield High School, Bakersfield, California
Redlands East Valley High School, California
Rockford East High School, Rockford, Illinois
Columbus East High School, Columbus, Indiana
Olathe East High School, Kansas
Wichita High School East, Kansas
East Grand Rapids High School, East Grand Rapids, Michigan
Lincoln East High School, Nebraska
East Chapel Hill High School, Chapel Hill, North Carolina
East Gaston High School, Mount Holly, North Carolina
Sciotoville Community School (East High School), Portsmouth, Ohio
Central Bucks East High School, Buckingham, Pennsylvania
West Chester East High School, West Chester, Pennsylvania
Cranston High School East, Cranston, Rhode Island
Austin-East High School, Knoxville, Tennessee
Green Bay East High School, Wisconsin
Madison East High School, Wisconsin
Appleton East High School, Wisconsin
Wauwatosa East High School, Wisconsin
Cheyenne East High School, Cheyenne, Wyoming

Fictional schools 

 East High School, the fictional school featured in High School Musical, located in Albuquerque, New Mexico

See also
Eastern High School (disambiguation)